Maurits Verdonck (21 April 1879 – 1 March 1968) was a Belgian writer. His work was part of the literature event in the art competition at the 1928 Summer Olympics.

References

1879 births
1968 deaths
20th-century Belgian male writers
Olympic competitors in art competitions
Writers from Ghent